The 2022 Swedish Individual Speedway Championship was the 2022 version of the Swedish Individual Speedway Championship. The title was won by Oliver Berntzon.

The final was held at the Motorstadium in Linköping on 28 June 2022.

Final standings

References 

Speedway competitions in Sweden